Feve or Feves may refer to:

 Fève, a small trinket in a king cake or similar dish
 Renfe Feve, a Spanish railway company
 Fèves, a commune in the Moselle department, Grand Est, France
 Betty Feves (1918–1985), American artist
 La Fève, historical name for the Merhavia kibbutz in Israel
 Fluorinated polyols (FEVE), a raw material to make polyurethane
 Fluoroethylene vinyl ether
 Rivière aux Fèves, an alternate name for the Galena River in Illinois, US

See also

 
 Fever (disambiguation)
 FEV (disambiguation)